Wolfgang Strengmann-Kuhn (born 20 May 1964) is a German politician of the Alliance 90/The Greens who has been serving as a member of the Bundestag from the state of Hesse from 2008 till 2013 and again since 2014.

Early life and education 
After graduating from high school, Strengmann-Kuhn studied economics at the University of Bielefeld, graduating as Diplom-Volkswirt in 1992.

Early career 
Strengmann-Kuhn then worked as a research assistant at the Faculty of Sociology at Bielefeld University from 1993 to 1995, at the Department of Economics at Goethe University Frankfurt from 1995 to 2000 and at the Faculty of Economics and Social Sciences at the University of Hohenheim from 2001 to 2003.

Political career 
Strengmann-Kuhn was a member of the Bundestag from 4 January 2008 to 2013 as successor to Margareta Wolf, representing the Offenbach district. At the end of January 2014, he returned to the Bundestag as successor to Priska Hinz. 

In parliament, Strengmann-Kuhn is a member of the Finance Committee and the Study Group on Vocational Education and Training. He also serves as his parliamentary group's spokesman on labour market policy and European social policy.

In the negotiations to form a so-called traffic light coalition of the Social Democratic Party (SPD), the Green Party and the Free Democratic Party (FDP) on the national level following the 2021 German elections, Strengmann-Kuhn was part of his party's delegation in the working group on labour policy, co-chaired by Hubertus Heil, Katharina Dröge and Johannes Vogel.

Other activities 
 German Federation for the Environment and Nature Conservation (BUND), Member
 German United Services Trade Union (ver.di), Member
 Institut Solidarische Moderne (ISM), Member

Political positions 
Amid the European migrant crisis in 2015, Strengmann-Kuhn joined fellow Green parliamentarians Luise Amtsberg, Annalena Baerbock, Franziska Brantner and Manuel Sarrazin in calling for more responsibilities for the European Commission in managing the European Union's intake of refugees, a clear mandate for Frontex and EU-managed facilities for asylum seekers in their countries of origin.

References

External links 

  
 Bundestag biography 

1964 births
Living people
Members of the Bundestag for Hesse
Members of the Bundestag 2021–2025
Members of the Bundestag 2017–2021
Members of the Bundestag 2013–2017
Members of the Bundestag 2009–2013
Members of the Bundestag 2005–2009
Members of the Bundestag for Alliance 90/The Greens